The 2007 Atlanta Falcons season was the 42nd season for the franchise in the National Football League (NFL). They finished the 2007 season with a record of 4–12 and failed to improve upon their 7–9 record in 2006 after finishing third place in the NFC South.

The season was marred with the Falcons' starting quarterback Michael Vick getting indicted on federal and state charges over his involvement in an illegal dog fighting ring. New head coach Bobby Petrino was initially hired to help develop Vick into a more complete quarterback and improve the Falcons' languid offense (ranked 25th in scoring) from the previous season, but with Vick's absence and longtime dependable backup quarterback Matt Schaub traded to the Houston Texans before Vick's indictment, Petrino was instead forced to rely on journeyman quarterbacks Joey Harrington, Byron Leftwich and Chris Redman for the offense. Petrino's game plan didn't fit, both on the field and in the locker room, with veteran players Alge Crumpler and DeAngelo Hall voicing their displeasure.

Petrino later resigned just 13 games into the season to coach the Arkansas Razorbacks. Petrino resigned the day after Michael Vick was sentenced to 23 months in prison and also a day after Petrino coached the Falcons in a 34–14 loss to the New Orleans Saints on Monday Night Football. He did not address his players in person, only leaving a hand-written note.

Offseason

Head coach change
Head coach Bobby Petrino spent less than a year with the Atlanta Falcons. He was hired on January 7, 2007 after the Falcons fired Jim Mora, Jr., who was fired on New Year's Day. On December 11, 2007, Petrino announced his resignation just 13 games into his first year.

Departures

 On March 2, the Falcons released linebackers Edgerton Hartwell and Ike Reese.
 On March 5, the Falcons released guard Matt Lehr and long-snapper Gavin Tarquinio.
 On March 6, wide receiver Ashley Lelie signed a contract with the San Francisco 49ers.
 On March 7, defensive end Patrick Kerney signed a contract with the Seattle Seahawks.
 On March 8, the Falcons traded quarterback Matt Schaub to the Houston Texans along with their 2007 first round pick (10th overall) in exchange for the Texans' first round pick (8th overall), a 2007 second round pick and a 2008 second round pick. 
 On March 9, fullback Justin Griffith signed a contract with the Oakland Raiders.

Signings
 On March 2, the Falcons signed fullback Ovie Mughelli, formerly with the Baltimore Ravens, to a contract.
 On March 3, the Falcons signed linebacker Marcus Wilkins, formerly with the Cincinnati Bengals, to a contract.
 On March 7, the Falcons signed cornerback Lewis Sanders, formerly with the Houston Texans, to a contract.
 On March 8, the Falcons signed wide receiver Joe Horn, formerly with the New Orleans Saints, to a contract.
 On March 15, the Falcons signed guard Toniu Fonoti, formerly with the Miami Dolphins, to a contract.
 On March 15, the Falcons signed wide receiver Derrick Hamilton, formerly with the San Francisco 49ers, to a contract.
 On March 22, the Falcons signed kicker Aaron Elling, formerly with the Baltimore Ravens, to a contract.
 On March 23, the Falcons signed quarterback Chris Redman to a contract.
 On April 9, the Falcons signed quarterback Joey Harrington, formerly with the Miami Dolphins, to a contract.
 On May 4, the Falcons signed kicker Billy Cundiff to a contract.
 On May 9, the Falcons signed tackle Leander Jordan, formerly with the San Diego Chargers, to a contract.

Free agents heading into the 2007 season

NFL Draft

Staff

Roster

Preseason

Regular season

Schedule

Game summaries

Week 1: at Minnesota Vikings

Hoping to put a troublesome off-season behind them, the Falcons began their 2007 campaign on the road against the Minnesota Vikings. In the first quarter, Atlanta immediately trailed as Vikings DT Kevin Williams returned an interception 54 yards for a touchdown, which was the only score of the half. In the third quarter, Minnesota increased its lead with kicker Ryan Longwell getting a 49-yard field goal. In the fourth quarter, the Falcons got their only score of the game, with kicker Matt Prater's 45-yard field goal. From there, the Vikings put the game away with QB Tarvaris Jackson completing a 60-yard TD pass to RB Adrian Peterson, along with CB Antoine Winfield returning an interception 14 yards for a touchdown.

QB Joey Harrington, in his Falcons debut, completed 23 out of 32 passes for 199 yards with no touchdowns and 2 interceptions.

With the loss, Atlanta began its season at 0–1.

Week 2: at Jacksonville Jaguars

Trying to rebound from their road loss to the Vikings, the Falcons went to Jacksonville Municipal Stadium for a Week 2 interconference fight with the Jacksonville Jaguars. After a scoreless first quarter, Atlanta trailed early as Jaguars kicker John Carney got a 35-yard field goal.  Afterwards, the Falcons had their only score of the game as RB Warrick Dunn got a 4-yard TD run. After a scoreless third quarter, Jacksonville sealed the win with QB David Garrard's 14-yard TD pass to WR Reggie Williams and Carney's 27-yard field goal.

With the loss, the Falcons fell to 0–2.

Week 3: vs. Carolina Panthers

Trying to avoid their first 0–3 start since 1999, the Falcons played their Week 3 home opener against their divisional rival, the Carolina Panthers. After a scoreless first quarter, Atlanta trailed early as Panthers kicker John Kasay got a 45-yard field goal. Afterwards, the Falcons took the lead with QB Joey Harrington completing a 69-yard TD pass to WR Roddy White. However, Carolina retook the lead with QB Jake Delhomme completing a 13-yard TD pass to RB DeShaun Foster. Atlanta tied the game prior to halftime with kicker Morten Andersen getting a 24-yard field goal.

In the third quarter, the Falcons regained the lead with Harrington completing a 13-yard TD pass to TE Alge Crumpler, yet the Panthers regained the lead with Delhomme completing a 5-yard TD pass to TE Jeff King, along with Foster's 10-yard TD run. In the fourth quarter, Carolina ended its scoring with Kasay kicking a 49-yard field goal. Atlanta tried to mount a comeback, yet the only score was Andersen's 25-yard field goal.

With the loss, the Falcons fell to 0–3.

Week 4: vs. Houston Texans

Still searching for their first win of the year, the Falcons stayed at home for an interconference duel with the Houston Texans, featuring a former teammate in QB Matt Schaub. In the first quarter, Atlanta delivered the first punch with kicker Morten Andersen getting a 28-yard field goal. However, the Texans took the lead with Schaub completing a 35-yard TD pass to WR André Davis. The Falcons regained the lead with QB Joey Harrington completing a 5-yard TD pass to WR Michael Jenkins. In the second quarter, Harrington and Jenkins hooked up with each other again on a 7-yard TD pass. Also, Andersen contributed to Atlanta's cause by kicking a 22-yard field goal. Houston ended the half with kicker Kris Brown getting a 42-yard field goal.

In the third quarter, the Texans drew close with Brown kicking a 37-yard field goal. The Falcons responded with Andersen getting a 36-yard field goal. In the fourth quarter, Houston tried to retaliate with Brown kicking a 19-yard field goal. Again, Atlanta answered with Andersen nailing a 46-yard field goal. Afterwards, the Falcons held on to give head coach Bobby Petrino his first NFL victory.

With the win, the Falcons snapped a six-game losing skid and improved to 1–3.

Week 5: at Tennessee Titans

Coming off their home win over the Texans, the Falcons flew to LP Field for a Week 5 interconference duel with the Tennessee Titans. In the first quarter, Atlanta got off to a fast start as CB DeAngelo Hall returned a LenDale White fumble 56 yards for a touchdown. The Titans tied the game with RB Chris Brown getting a 3-yard TD run. In the second quarter, the Falcons regained the lead with kicker Morten Andersen getting a 32-yard field goal. Tennessee ended the half with kicker Rob Bironas getting a 30-yard field goal.

In the third quarter, Atlanta got their lead back with Andersen kicking a 28-yard field goal. However, the Titans took the lead with Bironas nailing a 40-yard field goal, along with DB Vincent Fuller intercepting QB Joey Harrington and returning it 76 yards for a touchdown. In the fourth quarter, with Harrington being ineffective (16/31 for 87 yards and 1 interception), back-up QB Byron Leftwich came to try to lead the Falcons to victory. Near the end of the game, Atlanta came close (at Tennessee's 1-yard line). On four-straight plays, they were held out of the end zone, with Albert Haynesworth making a leaping tackle of Warrick Dunn in the backfield after hurdling an offensive lineman.

With the loss, not only did the Falcons fall to 1–4, but it also marked their fifth straight loss to the Titans.

Week 6: vs New York Giants

Hoping to rebound from their road loss to the Titans, the Falcons came home for Monday Night Football has they hosted the New York Giants. In the first quarter, Atlanta took flight early as kicker Morten Andersen got a 47-yard field goal. However, the Giants responded with QB Eli Manning completing a 5-yard TD pass to WR Amani Toomer. The Falcons answered with RB Jerious Norwood getting a 67-yard TD run. Afterwards, New York replied with RB Reuben Droughns getting a 1-yard TD run. In the second quarter, Atlanta's struggles continued as Manning completed a 43-yard TD pass to WR Plaxico Burress to increase the Giants' lead. After a scoreless third quarter, New York sealed the win with kicker Lawrence Tynes nailing a 32-yard field goal, while RB Derrick Ward got a 9-yard TD run.

With their second-straight loss, the Falcons fell to 1–5.

Week 7: at New Orleans Saints

Trying to snap a two-game skid, the Falcons flew to the Louisiana Superdome for a Week 7 divisional duel with the New Orleans Saints. Due to QB Joey Harrington's ineffectiveness from last week's loss to the Giants, QB Byron Leftwich was given the start.

In the first quarter, Atlanta trailed early as Saints QB Drew Brees completed a 37-yard TD pass to WR Devery Henderson. The Falcons responded with former Saints kicker Morten Andersen's 38-yard field goal. In the second quarter, Atlanta began to play well as Andersen got a 33-yard field goal, while Leftwich completed a 9-yard TD pass to WR Roddy White.

In the third quarter, New Orleans retook the lead with RB Pierre Thomas getting a 24-yard TD run. On the Falcons' next possession, Leftwich's left leg got injured during a sack by Saints DE Will Smith. Harrington took over for the rest of the game. In the fourth quarter, Andersen gave Atlanta a 21-yard field goal. The Saints sealed the win with Brees hooking up with RB Reggie Bush on a 4-yard TD pass, along with Bush's 2-point conversion run.

With their third-straight loss, the Falcons entered their bye week at 1–6.

Week 9: vs. San Francisco 49ers

Trying to snap a three-game skid, the Falcons went home and played a Week 9 intraconference duel with the San Francisco 49ers. In the first quarter, Atlanta trailed early as 49ers RB Maurice Hicks got a 9-yard TD run. The Falcons responded with RB Warrick Dunn getting a 9-yard TD run. In the second quarter, Atlanta increased its lead with RB Ovie Mughelli getting a 1-yard TD run for the only score of the period.

In the third quarter, San Francisco crept close as kicker Joe Nedney got a 49-yard and a 32-yard field goal.  Fortunately, in the fourth quarter, the Falcons answered with kicker Morten Andersen getting a 33-yard field goal. The 49ers responded with Nedney kicking a 22-yard field goal, yet Atlanta got the win with Andersen nailing a 27-yard field goal.

With the win, the Falcons improved to 2–6.

The struggling Falcons rushing attack had its best performance (to date) with 155 total rushing yards.

Week 10: at Carolina Panthers

Coming off their home win over the 49ers, the Falcons flew to Bank of America Stadium for an NFC South rematch with the Carolina Panthers. In the first quarter, Atlanta took flight as RB Warrick Dunn got a 30-yard TD run for the only score of the period. In the second quarter, the Panthers took the lead as CB Ken Lucas returned a fumble 27 yards for a touchdown, while kicker John Kasay managed to get a 29-yard field goal.

In the third quarter, the Falcons tied the game with kicker Morten Andersen getting a 36-yard field goal for the only score of the period. In the fourth quarter, Atlanta took the lead with Andersen kicking a 47-yard field goal. Carolina tied the game with Kasay nailing a 31-yard field goal. Fortunately, the Falcons got the win with QB Joey Harrington completing a 30-yard TD pass to TE Alge Crumpler.

With the win, Atlanta improved to 3–6.

Week 11: vs. Tampa Bay Buccaneers 

Coming off their divisional road win over the Panthers, the Falcons went home a Week 11 divisional duel with the Tampa Bay Buccaneers. Despite QB Joey Harrington giving Atlanta two-straight wins, QB Byron Leftwich was given the start.

In the first quarter, the Falcons trailed early as Buccaneers QB Jeff Garcia completed a 44-yard TD pass to WR Joey Galloway for the only score of the period. In the second quarter, Atlanta continued to trail as Tampa Bay CB Ronde Barber returned a fumble 41 yards for a touchdown. In the third quarter, the Buccaneers continued their beatdown with kicker Matt Bryant nailing a 23-yard field goal, while Garcia completed a 21-yard TD pass to TE Alex Smith. In the fourth quarter, Tampa Bay sealed the win with RB Earnest Graham getting a 26-yard TD run. The Falcons avoided the shutout as Harrington came onto the field and completed a 7-yard TD pass to WR Adam Jennings.

With the loss, Atlanta fell to 3–7.

Week 12: vs. Indianapolis Colts

Hoping to rebound from their divisional loss to the Buccaneers, the Falcons stayed at home and played a Week 12 Thanksgiving interconference duel with the defending Super Bowl champion Indianapolis Colts. In the first quarter, Atlanta led early as they ended a 19-play, 63-yard drive with kicker Morten Andersen's 34-yard field goal. Later, the Falcons increased their lead with QB Joey Harrington completing a 48-yard TD pass to WR Roddy White. In the second quarter, the Colts got on the board with QB Peyton Manning completing a 23-yard TD pass to WR Reggie Wayne. Atlanta responded with Andersen kicking a 30-yard field goal, but Indianapolis started to gain steam as Manning found TE Dallas Clark on an 8-yard TD pass and TE Ben Utecht on a 5-yard TD pass.

In the third quarter, Colts' RB Joseph Addai got a 4-yard TD run, while kicker Adam Vinatieri nailed a 24-yard field goal.

With the loss, the Falcons fell to 3–8.

Despite the loss, RB Warrick Dunn (17 carries for 70 yards) became the 22nd player in NFL history to get 10,000 career rushing yards. He became the third RB under 5 feet, 9 inches to reach 10,000 yards rushing.

Week 13: at St. Louis Rams

Trying to snap a two-game losing skid, the Falcons flew to the Edward Jones Dome for a Week 13 intraconference duel with the St. Louis Rams. In the first quarter, Atlanta trailed early as Rams QB Gus Frerotte completed a 1-yard TD pass to TE Randy McMichael, along with a 31-yard TD pass to WR Torry Holt. In the second quarter, St. Louis increased its lead with Frerotte completing an 8-yard TD pass to WR Isaac Bruce for the only score of the period.

In the third quarter, the Falcons got on the board as kicker Morten Andersen kicked a 41-yard field goal for the only score of the period. In the fourth quarter, Atlanta tried to come back as QB Chris Redman completed a 15-yard TD pass to WR Roddy White, along with a 5-yard TD pass to WR Michael Jenkins. However, the Rams sealed the win with RB Steven Jackson scoring on a 50-yard TD run.

With their third-straight loss, the Falcons fell to 3–9.

Week 14: vs. New Orleans Saints

Trying to snap a three-game slide, the Falcons went home for a Week 14 Monday Night NFC South rematch with the New Orleans Saints. Making his first start at QB since 2002 was Chris Redman.

In the first quarter, Atlanta trailed early as Saints QB Drew Brees completed a 25-yard TD pass to WR David Patten. The Falcons answered with Redman completing a 33-yard TD pass to WR Roddy White. In the second quarter, New Orleans began to pull away as kicker Olindo Mare made a 23-yard field goal, while Brees completed a 15-yard TD pass to WR Marques Colston.

In the third quarter, the Saints pulled away as Brees and Colston hooked up with each other again on a 2-yard TD pass, while safety Roman Harper returned an interception 31 yards for a touchdown. In the fourth quarter, Atlanta got one last touchdown and Redman completed a 13-yard TD pass to WR Michael Jenkins. New Orleans sealed the win with Mare's 36-yard field goal.

With their fourth-straight loss, the Falcons fell to 3–10.

Following the game, it was announced that head coach Bobby Petrino had resigned from the Falcons. Afterwards, on Wednesday, December 12, it was announced that defensive backs coach Emmitt Thomas would be Atlanta's interim head coach for the rest of the season.

Week 15: at Tampa Bay Buccaneers

Trying to snap a four-game skid, the Falcons flew to Raymond James Stadium for a Week 15 NFC South rematch with the Tampa Bay Buccaneers. In the first quarter, Atlanta trailed early as Buccaneers CB Ronde Barber returned an interception 29 yards for a touchdown. The Falcons responded with kicker Morten Andersen getting a 33-yard field goal for their only score of the game. However, Tampa Bay immediately responded with WR Micheal Spurlock returning a kickoff 90 yards for a touchdown (the Buccaneers' first kickoff return for a touchdown in franchise history). In the second quarter, the Falcons' year-long struggles continued as kicker Matt Bryant made a 33-yard field goal, RB Earnest Graham getting a 1-yard TD run, and Bryant kicking a 28-yard field goal.

In the third quarter, Atlanta's turmoil continued with Bryant nailing a 34-yard field goal for the only score of the period. In the fourth quarter, Tampa Bay sealed the win with QB Jeff Garcia completing a 1-yard TD pass to TE Anthony Becht.

With their fifth-straight loss, the Falcons fell to 3–11.

Week 16: at Arizona Cardinals

Week 17: vs. Seattle Seahawks

The Falcons salvaged one final win from the wreckage of their 2007 season in a 44-41 win over the playoff-bound Seahawks.  The game lead tied or changed eight times in the first 47 minutes of game time until with his team now up 34-27 Chris Crocker picked off Seneca Wallace; from there Chris Redman completed his fourth touchdown of the game (it was Roddy White’s only score of the game).  Despite two more Seahawks scores Morten Andersen’s 32-yard kick with 3:26 to go iced a 44-41 Falcons win. This was the final kick of Andersen’s 26-year career dating back to 1982.

Standings

See also
2021 Houston Texans season, whose quarterback, Deshaun Watson, was also inactive due to personal conduct allegations
2021 Jacksonville Jaguars season, whose coach, Urban Meyer, also lasted less than one season
2022 Denver Broncos season, whose coach, Nathaniel Hackett, also lasted less than one season.
List of other NFL teams affected by internal conflict

References

External links
 2007 Atlanta Falcons at Pro-Football-Reference.com

Atlanta
Atlanta Falcons seasons
Atlanta